Sara Poidevin (born 7 May 1996) is a Canadian professional racing cyclist, who currently rides for UCI Women's Continental Team . She initially raced mountain bikes before switching to road racing in 2013.

Major results
2016
1st  Young rider classification Cascade Cycling Classic
 2nd Young rider classification Tour of the Gila
 3rd Mountains classification Tour of the Gila

2017
 1st  Overall Colorado Classic
1st  Points classification
1st  Mountains classification
1st  Young rider classification
1st Stage 2
 2nd Overall Cascade Cycling Classic
1st  Mountains classification 
1st  Young rider classification
1st Stage 5

2018
 1st  Young rider classification Tour Cycliste Féminin International de l'Ardèche
 3rd Stage 4 Tour Cycliste Féminin International de l'Ardèche
 6th Overall Tour Cycliste Féminin International de l'Ardèche
 2nd Overall Tour of the Gila
 2nd Stage 1 Tour of the Gila
 2nd Stage 3 Tour of the Gila
1st  Young rider classification
3rd Mountains classification  
 3rd Mountains classification Tour of California
 7th Overall Tour of California
1st  Young rider classification

2021
 National Road Championships
3rd Road race

See also
 List of 2016 UCI Women's Teams and riders

References

External links
 

1996 births
Living people
Canadian female cyclists
People from Canmore, Alberta
20th-century Canadian women
21st-century Canadian women